Joshua David Greene is an American experimental psychologist, neuroscientist, and philosopher. He is a Professor of Psychology at Harvard University. Most of his research and writing has been concerned with moral judgment and decision-making. His recent research focuses on fundamental issues in cognitive science.

Education and career 
Greene attended high school in Fort Lauderdale, Broward County, Florida. He briefly attended the Wharton School of the University of Pennsylvania before transferring to Harvard University. He earned a bachelor's degree in philosophy from Harvard in 1997, followed by a Ph.D. in philosophy at Princeton University under the supervision of David Lewis and Gilbert Harman. Peter Singer also served on his dissertation committee. His 2002 dissertation, The Terrible, Horrible, No Good, Very Bad Truth About Morality and What to Do About It, argues against moral-realist language and in defense of non-realist utilitarianism as a better framework for resolving disagreements. Greene served as a postdoctoral fellow at Princeton in the Neuroscience of Cognitive Control Laboratory before returning to Harvard in 2006 as an assistant professor. In 2011, he became the John and Ruth Hazel Associate Professor of the Social Sciences. Since 2014, he has been a Professor of Psychology.

Dual-process theory 
Greene and colleagues have advanced a dual process theory of moral judgment, suggesting that moral judgments are determined by both automatic, emotional responses and controlled, conscious reasoning. In particular, Greene argues that the "central tension" in ethics between deontology (rights- or duty-based moral theories) and consequentialism (outcome-based theories) reflects the competing influences of these two types of processes:Characteristically deontological judgments are preferentially supposed by automatic emotional responses, while characteristically consequentialist judgments are preferentially supported by conscious reasoning and allied processes of cognitive control.In one of the first experiments to suggest a moral dual-process model, Greene and colleagues showed that people making judgments about "personal" moral dilemmas (like whether to push one person in front of an oncoming trolley in order to save five others) engaged several brain regions associated with emotion that were not activated by judgments that were more "impersonal" (like whether to pull a switch to redirect a trolley from a track on which it would kill five people onto a track on which it would kill one other person instead). They also found that for the dilemmas involving "personal" moral questions, those who did make the intuitively unappealing choice had longer reaction times than those who made the more emotionally pleasant decision.

A follow-up study compared "easy" personal moral questions to which subjects had fast reaction times against "hard" dilemmas (like the footbridge problem) to which they had slow reaction times. When responding to the hard problems, subjects displayed increased activity in the anterior dorsolateral prefrontal cortex (DLPFC) and inferior parietal lobes—areas associated with cognitive processing—as well as the anterior cingulate cortex—which has been implicated in error detection between two confusing inputs, as in the Stroop task). This comparison demonstrated that harder problems activated different brain regions, but it didn't prove differential activity for the same moral problem depending on the answer given. This was done in the second part of the study, in which the authors showed that for a given question, those subjects who made the utilitarian choices did have higher activity in the anterior DLPFC and the right inferior parietal lobe than subjects making non-utilitarian choices.

These two studies were correlational, but others have since suggested a causal impact of emotional vs. cognitive processing on deontological vs. utilitarian judgments. A 2008 study by Greene showed that cognitive load caused subjects to take longer to respond when they made a utilitarian moral judgment but had no effect on response time when they made a non-utilitarian judgment, suggesting that the utilitarian thought processes required extra cognitive effort.

Greene's 2008 article "The Secret Joke of Kant's Soul" argues that Kantian/deontological ethics is best understood as rationalization rather than rationalism—an attempt to justify intuitive moral judgments post-hoc. Several philosophers have written critical responses.

Moral Tribes 
Drawing on dual-process theory, as well as evolutionary psychology and other neuroscience work, Greene's book Moral Tribes (2013) explores how our ethical intuitions play out in the modern world.

Greene posits that humans have an instinctive, automatic tendency to cooperate with others in their social group on tragedy of the commons scenarios ("me versus us"). For example, in a cooperative investment game, people are more likely to do what's best for the group when they're under time pressure or when they're primed to "go with their gut", and inversely, cooperation can be inhibited by rational calculation.
However, on questions of inter-group harmony ("us versus them"), automatic intuitions run into a problem, which Greene calls the "tragedy of commonsense morality". The same ingroup loyalty that achieves cooperation within a community leads to hostility between communities. In response, Greene proposes a "metamorality" based on a "common currency" that all humans can agree upon and suggests that utilitarianism—or as he calls it, "deep pragmatism"—is up to the task.

Reception 
Moral Tribes received multiple positive reviews.

Thomas Nagel critiques the book by suggesting that Greene is too quick to conclude utilitarianism specifically from the general goal of constructing an impartial morality; for example, he says, Immanuel Kant and John Rawls offer other impartial approaches to ethical questions.

Robert Wright calls Greene's proposal for global harmony ambitious and adds, "I like ambition!" But he also claims that people have a tendency to see facts in a way that serves their ingroup, even if there's no disagreement about the underlying moral principles that govern the disputes. "If indeed we're wired for tribalism", Wright explains, "then maybe much of the problem has less to do with differing moral visions than with the simple fact that my tribe is my tribe and your tribe is your tribe. Both Greene and Paul Bloom cite studies in which people were randomly divided into two groups and immediately favored members of their own group in allocating resources—even when they knew the assignment was random." Instead, Wright proposes that "nourishing the seeds of enlightenment indigenous to the world's tribes is a better bet than trying to convert all the tribes to utilitarianism—both more likely to succeed, and more effective if it does."

Greene's metamorality of deep pragmatism has recently been criticized by Steven Kraaijeveld and Hanno Sauer for being based on conflicting arguments about moral truth.

Awards and distinctions 
Greene received the 2012 Stanton Prize from the Society for Philosophy and Psychology.

In 2013, Greene was awarded the Roslyn Abramson Award, given annually to Harvard faculty "in recognition of his or her excellence and sensitivity in teaching undergraduates".

Bibliography

See also 
 Dual process theory
 Experimental philosophy
 Evolutionary psychology

References

External links 

Living people
American cognitive neuroscientists
21st-century American philosophers
Harvard University faculty
Utilitarians
Consequentialists
Harvard College alumni
Wharton School of the University of Pennsylvania alumni
Princeton University alumni
American moral psychologists
Year of birth missing (living people)